John Gaudry "Chip" Dicks, III (born May 22, 1951) is an American lobbyist and former Democratic member of the Virginia House of Delegates, serving from 1983 to 1990. He was defeated for reelection in 1989 by Republican Kirk Cox.

Electoral history

References

External links
 

1951 births
Living people
Democratic Party members of the Virginia House of Delegates
Methodist University alumni
Stetson University College of Law alumni
20th-century American politicians
Politicians from Petersburg, Virginia